The ghaychak or gheychak (Persian: غیچک) is a bowed lute used in Iran, Afghanistan, Pakistan and Tajikistan. The name is similar to the Central Asian ghijak, but that instrument is more closely related to the kamancheh.

Double-chambered bowl lute
A double-chambered bowl lute with four or more metal strings and a short fretless neck. It is used by Iranians and Baloch people, and is similar to Sarinda. The soundbox is carved out of a single piece of wood. The upper orifice is partly covered in the middle by the handle and the lower one is covered by a skin membrane against which the bridge rests.

Sources

References

External links

Ghaychak

String instruments
Persian musical instruments
Iranian inventions